Branka is a Serbo-Croatian female given name derived from the Slavic root bran – the same as in Branislav and Branimir – with the meaning "to defend or protect". It can also be a version of the Portuguese name Branca meaning "white" (Casablanca was originally called Casabranca). The name Branka became popular in the territory of former Yugoslavia some hundred years ago. 

The name Branka may refer to:

People
 Branka Katić (born 1970), Serbian actress
 Branka Nevistić (born 1968), Serbian television presenter and journalist
 Branka Prpa (born 1953), historian, author, and director of Belgrade’s Historical Archives

In fiction
 Branka, a character from the video game Dragon Age: Origins

Groups
 Branka, a splinter group of the Basque armed separatist group Euskadi Ta Askatasuna (ETA) led by Txillardegi from the 1960s to the 1970s

Places
Branka u Opavy, a municipality and village in the Czech Republic
Branka, a village and administrative part of Halže in the Czech Republic

See also
Branca, a feminine given name
Bianca, a feminine given name
Bianka, a feminine given name
Blanca (given name), a feminine given name
Blanka (given name), a feminine given name

References

External links

Slavic feminine given names
Bosnian feminine given names
Bulgarian feminine given names
Croatian feminine given names
Czech feminine given names
Macedonian feminine given names
Montenegrin feminine given names
Slovak feminine given names
Slovene feminine given names
Serbian feminine given names
Feminine given names

it:Branka